James Reid was a Scottish rugby football player.

He also played for Edinburgh Wanderers.

He was the brother of Charles Reid ("Hippo") who was also capped for Scotland.

References
 Bath, Richard (ed.) The Scotland Rugby Miscellany (Vision Sports Publishing Ltd, 2007 )

Scottish rugby union players
Scotland international rugby union players
East of Scotland District players
Edinburgh District (rugby union) players